Euryomma is a genus of species of flies of the family Fanniidae.  The genus was originally proposed by the entomologist Paul Stein in 1899. Although at that time most authorities placed them in the family Muscidae. The distribution of Euryomma is mainly Neotropical, on the whole restricted to the Americas, there is also one Nearctic species, the exception being of the very cosmopolitan E. peregrinum (Meigen, 1826)

Description 
With bare arista (as in Fannia), with the first pre-sutural dorsocentral bristle less than half as long as second. Males have a lower orbital bristle.

Species list 
 Euryomma aburrae Grisales et al., 2012
 Euryomma americanum Chillcott, 1961
 Euryomma annosa Chillcott, 1961
 Euryomma arcuata Chillcott, 1961
 Euryomma campineira Carvalho & Pamplona, 1979
 Euryomma carioca Albuquerque, 1956
 Euryomma chitarera Grisales et al., 2012
 Euryomma cornuatum Grisales et al., 2012
 Euryomma erythrogaster Séguy, 1941
 Euryomma guane Grisales et al., 2012
 Euryomma hispaniense Stein, 1899
 Euryomma longicorne Stein, 1911
 Euryomma muisca Grisales et al., 2012
 Euryomma nigrifemur Stein, 1911
 Euryomma palpingens Wendt & Carvalho, 2007
 Euryomma peregrinum (Meigen, 1826)
 Euryomma rettenmeyeri Chillcott, 1958
 Euryomma rufifrons Stein, 1911
 Euryomma tahami Grisales et al., 2012
 Euryomma uwa Grisales et al., 2012

References 

Fanniidae
Schizophora genera
Taxa named by Paul Stein